A Corner of a Foreign Field: The Indian History of a British Sport is a 2002 book by Indian historian Ramachandra Guha that offers a historical account of cricket in the Indian subcontinent. Some critics have called it one of the finest books on cricket.

Background 
The book was initially conceived as a biography of left-arm spinner Palwankar Baloo. Baloo was a Dalit, a community that has historically been subjected to untouchability under the Indian caste system. His cricketing feats, however, enabled him to overcome contemporary Indian social barriers associated with being a Dalit. As Guha explored Baloo's story further, the book expanded to become a social history of cricket in India. On the subject of the book, Guha has written, "The making of modern India is its theme, with cricket serving merely as a vehicle, as my chief source of illustrative example."

Editions 
An early edition cover featured a picture of author R.K. Narayan playing cricket with his nephews and niece.

References  

Indian non-fiction books
Cricket books
2002 non-fiction books